The uses of heraldry in Belarus is used by government bodies, subdivisions of the national government, organizations, corporations and by families.

History 
The history of Belarusian heraldry is integral to that of the szlachta, the Polish-Belarusian nobility, and therefore to the history of Polish heraldry.

Until it was absorbed into the Soviet Union, Belarus (as the Belarusian Democratic Republic and earlier as the Grand Duchy of Lithuania) was represented by a coat of arms: a charging knight on a red field, called the Pahonia ('the Chase').

Throughout the communist period, coats of arms fell out of favor and were replaced by emblems. The cities still used shields, but these were changed to add socialist realism or to announce the state awards each city earned.

Once the Soviet Union fell apart in 1991, the Pahonia was restored as the state coat of arms and the cities reverted to old coat of arms or created new designs. Each of the seven voblasts of Belarus has its own coat of arms.  Historical achievements, state awards or state symbols are placed on the coat of arms.  For example, the enterprise "October" features the state flag of Belarus on their coat of arms.

State symbols

Civic heraldry

There have been several waves of Belarusian cities receiving coats of arms. Firstly, many cities received coats of arms under the Magdeburg Law during the times of the Grand Duchy of Lithuania and the Polish–Lithuanian Commonwealth.

After the Partitions of Poland, territories in modern-day Belarus were incorporated into the Russian Empire. In the late 18th century and during the 19th century, the authorities of the Russian Empire assigned new coats of arms to most Belarusian cities, often aiming to emphasize the cities' conquest by the Russians.

In the Belarusian SSR era, cities didn't have any official coats of arms. In the late years of the USSR, Russian-Empire-era coats of arms were sporadically used as informal symbols.

After the restoration of the independence of Belarus in 1991, the cities of Belarus have restored the official usage of coats of arms. Most cities have restored the initial medieval coats of arms, fewer have restored the coats of arms granted during the Russian Empire.

Regional heraldry

Medieval history

During the times of the Grand Duchy of Lithuania and the Polish–Lithuanian Commonwealth, the Pahonia has been the dominating symbol on the coats of arms on the provinces on the territory of today's Belarus.

Under the Russian Empire

After annexation of Belarus to the Russian Empire, new administrative divisions (gubernyas, or governorates) were introduced. Vitebsk and Vilno governorates inherited coats of arms of their former voivodeships.

Independent Belarus

After the restoration of the independence of Belarus, the regions received new coats of arms, mostly basing on the coats of the Russian era governorates.

Personal heraldry
See Armorial of Polish nobility

The nobility of the historical regions of modern Belarus, which comprise parts of Lithuania propria and White Ruthenia, were a historical part of the Lithuanian nobility and Ruthenian nobility in the Grand Duchy of Lithuania. Very early the nobility of the Grand Duchy of Lithuania adopted the heraldic tradition of the Polish szlachta. The heraldry of the Belarusian nobility constitutes a part of the Polish heraldry.

Ecclesiastic heraldry

The Belarusian Roman Catholic senior clergy has personal coats of arms as according to the customs of catholic ecclesiastical heraldry.

See also 

 Lithuanian nobility 
 National symbols of Lithuania 
 Polish heraldry
 List of coats of arms of Polish nobility
 History of Belarus
 List of Belarusian Coats of Arms
 Ruthenia
 Ruthenian nobility 
 Belarusian name

Further reading
 Tadeusz Gajl, "Herby szlacheckie Rzeczypospolitej Obojga Narodow", Gdańsk, 2003

External links

 Belarusian Nobility Coats of Arms 
 Coats of Arms of Lands of the Commonwealth
 Arms of the Belarusian cities 
 The state symbols of Great Litva/Belarus
 Arms of the cities in the Minsk Oblast  

Belarusian coats of arms
Belarus-related lists
Heraldry by country